Moorhouse and South Elmsall Halt was a railway station situated on the Hull and Barnsley Railway's branch line from Wrangbrook to Wath-upon-Dearne. The station served the village of Moorhouse and the town of South Elmsall on the South Yorkshire / West Yorkshire boundary, although this was about a mile distance. The station is located between Hickleton and Thurnscoe and Wrangbrook Junction, where the Wath branch joined the main line. The single storey station building, on the Wath-bound platform was, unlike the others on the line, built of brick with a slate roof. The other platform had just a simple waiting room for the few passengers who used the station. The platform surfaces were gravel and stone edged. The station master's house, of a standard Hull and Barnsley style, was situated a road level by the underbridge.

Opening day was on 28 August 1902 and the station closed, along with the others on the line, on 6 April 1929.

To the north of the station a spur connecting this line to the West Riding and Grimsby Railway at Hampole diverged.

References 
Railways of South Yorkshire, C.T.Goode. Dalesman Publishing. 

Disused railway stations in Doncaster
Railway stations in Great Britain opened in 1902
Railway stations in Great Britain closed in 1929
Former Hull and Barnsley Railway stations